The Eraser Rmxs is a remix album of songs from The Eraser, the debut studio album by English musician Thom Yorke. The album was originally intended for release in Japan only on 28 May 2008, and later 25 June 2008, by Warner Bros. Records. It was eventually released on 27 August 2008. It contains 9 remixes of 8 tracks from Yorke's 2006 solo album The Eraser by various electronica, dubstep, and techno artists. The remixes had earlier been released in the UK by XL Recordings as three EPs, each comprising three tracks. The EPs were first released as downloads in December 2007, then on 12" vinyl records in early 2008.

Critical reception

The Eraser Rmxs received mixed reviews from music critics, with most viewing the release as unnecessary. Resident Advisor's Daniel Bates said "These nine reworks presented a chance to make amends, but most of the remixers seem to have fallen into the same habit Yorke did: playing it safe", though praised the remixes of "Harrowdown Hill" and "Analyse". Jory Spadea of Spectrum Culture viewed the album as superfluous and inferior to its parent album, but singled out Four Tet's folktronica remix of "Atoms For Peace" for possibly outshining the original with its "Radiohead-like climax". Ryan Domball of Pitchfork was more positive overall, complimenting the collection's hopeful tone and especially Burial's remix of "And It Rained All Night", saying "Yorke's voice suits Burial's soupy concoctions just as nicely as those mysterious R&B divas he's usually fond of-- if this team ever decided to meet on an LP level, few would oppose."

Track listing

CD version
 "And It Rained All Night" (Burial Remix) – 4:13
 "The Clock" (Surgeon Remix) – 6:23
 "Harrowdown Hill" (The Bug Remix) – 5:16
 "Skip Divided" (Modeselektor Remix) – 5:35
 "Atoms for Peace" (Four Tet Remix) – 5:56
 "Cymbal Rush" (The Field Late Night Essen Und Trinken Remix) – 8:07
 "Black Swan" (Cristian Vogel Spare Parts Remix) – 6:09
 "Analyse" (Various Remix) – 4:09
 "Black Swan" (Vogel Bonus Beat Eraser Remix) – 7:50

Vinyl and download version
Part 1 (XLT 335):
 "And It Rained All Night" (Burial Remix) – 4:13
 "Skip Divided" (Modeselektor Remix) – 5:35
 "Analyse" (Various Remix) – 4:09
Part 2 (XLT 336):
 "Atoms for Peace" (Four Tet Remix) – 5:56
 "Black Swan" (Cristian Vogel Spare Parts Remix) – 6:09
 "Black Swan" (Vogel Bonus Beat Eraser Remix) – 7:50
Part 3 (XLT 337):
 "The Clock" (Surgeon Remix) – 6:23
 "Harrowdown Hill" (The Bug Remix) – 5:16
 "Cymbal Rush" (The Field Late Night Essen Und Trinken Remix) – 8:07

References

External links
 Homepage
 The Eraser page at the XL Recordings website.

Thom Yorke albums
2008 remix albums
XL Recordings remix albums
Warner Records remix albums